The Canadian Federation of University Women (CFUW) (French: Fédération canadienne des femmes diplômées des universités [FCFDU])  is a non-partisan, voluntary, self-funded organization with nearly 100 CFUW Clubs, located in every province across Canada. Founded in 1919, CFUW has been working to improve the status of women and to promote human rights, public education, social justice, and peace. Every year, CFUW and its Clubs award close to $1 million to women to help them pursue post-secondary studies. CFUW was “born out of the struggle by 19 and early 20th Century women to gain admittance to Canadian universities," to support women’s learning and provide fellowship to the small number of university-educated women at the time. CFUW also provides funding for library and creative arts awards. CFUW Clubs provide lifelong learning opportunities and fellowship to its members. There are over 100 lecture series, 200 book clubs and 75 issues groups offered by CFUW Clubs. CFUW Clubs are involved in community-based activities and advocacy directed to all levels of government such as working to prevent violence against women, child poverty, early learning and child care.

As CFUW President from 1964 to 1967, Laura Sabia led a coalition of 32 women's organizations across Canada demanding that the Government of Canada "pursue the human rights of women in Canada” by establishing a Royal Commission on the Status of Women. Sabia threatened a march of three million women on Ottawa if the Commission was not established.

CFUW is the largest affiliate of the Graduate Women International and holds special consultative status with the Economic and Social Council of the United Nations, as well as representation on the Sectoral Committee on Education for the Canadian Sub-Committee for UNESCO. CFUW regularly sends a delegation to the United Nations Commission on the Status of Women.

Among other activities, it supports the CFUW/FCFDU Charitable Trust, which awards fellowships for post-graduate education and funds the Creative Music Award.

Archives 
There are Canadian Federation of University Women fonds at Library and Archives Canada. The archival reference number is R2770.

References

External links

Organizations established in 1919
Women's organizations based in Canada
Educational organizations based in Ontario
Organizations based in Ottawa